Jayanta Mallabaruah is an Indian politician from the state of Assam. He was a two term member of the Assam Legislative Assembly, from 2011 to 2016 and 2021 to present. He has been appointed Cabinet Minister in the recent cabinet expansion of the Government of Assam headed by Chief Minister Dr. Himanta Biswa Sarma. 

Mallabaruah currently holds the portfolio of Public Health Engineering, Skill, Employment & Entrepreneurship and Tourism. Before this he was the Political Secretary to the Chief Minister of Assam. In 2017, he was appointed the Chairman of the Assam Tourism Development Corporation. During his tenure as Chairman of ATDC he drew attention by holding the Filmfare award show in Assam, the first time that the show was held outside Mumbai in its 65-year history.

Constituency
Baruah represented the Nalbari (Vidhan Sabha constituency). Baruah won the seat on an Indian National Congress ticket, beating the sitting Member of the Assam Legislative Assembly Alaka Sarma from the Asom Gana Parishad by about 9000 votes. In the legislative assembly election of 2021, Jayanta Malla Baruah won No.59 Nalbari Constituency as a member of the Bharatiya Janata Party, defeating Shri Pradyut Bhuyan of the Indian National Congress party.

Political party  
Baruah was a member of the Indian National Congress, but in 2015 he switched party and joined the Bharatiya Janata Party. Baruah was later denied a ticket from a party to contest the 2016 Assam Legislative Assembly election. Later he served as the Chairman of Assam Tourism Corporation. At present day he is a prominent leader of BJP Assam Pradesh.

References 

Living people
Assam MLAs 2011–2016
Bharatiya Janata Party politicians from Assam
Assam MLAs 2021–2026
1971 births